The Q cycle (named for quinol) describes a series of reactions that describe how the sequential oxidation and reduction of the lipophilic electron carrier, Coenzyme Q (CoQ), between the ubiquinol and ubiquinone forms, can result in the net movement of protons across a lipid bilayer (in the case of the mitochondria, the inner mitochondrial membrane).

The Q cycle was first proposed by Peter D. Mitchell, though a modified version of Mitchell's original scheme is now accepted as the mechanism by which Complex III moves protons (i.e. how complex III contributes to the biochemical generation of the proton or pH, gradient, which is used for the biochemical generation of ATP).

The first reaction of Q cycle is the 2-electron oxidation of ubiquinol by two oxidants,  c1 (Fe3+) and ubiquinone:
 CoQH2 + cytochrome c1 (Fe3+) + CoQ'  → CoQ + CoQ'−• + cytochrome c1 (Fe2+) + 2 H+ (intermembrane)
The second reaction of the cycle involves the 2-electron oxidation of a second ubiquinol by two oxidants, a fresh c1 (Fe3+) and the CoQ'−• produced in the first step:
 CoQH2 + cytochrome c1 (Fe3+) + CoQ'−•  + 2 H+ (matrix)→ CoQ + CoQ'H−2 + cytochrome c1 (Fe2+) + 2 H+ (intermembrane)

These net reactions are mediated by electron-transfer mediators including a Rieske 2Fe-2S cluster (shunt to  c1) and  cb  (shunt to CoQ'  and later to CoQ'−•) 

In chloroplasts, a similar reaction is done with plastoquinone by cytochrome b6f complex.

Process 
Operation of the modified Q cycle in Complex III results in the reduction of Cytochrome c, oxidation of ubiquinol to ubiquinone, and the transfer of four protons into the intermembrane space, per two-cycle process.

Ubiquinol (QH2) binds to the Qo site of complex III via hydrogen bonding to His182 of the Rieske iron-sulfur protein and Glu272 of Cytochrome b. Ubiquinone (Q), in turn, binds the Qi site of complex III.  Ubiquinol is divergently oxidized (gives up one electron each) to the Rieske iron-sulfur '(FeS) protein' and to the bL heme.  This oxidation reaction produces a transient semiquinone before complete oxidation to ubiquinone, which then leaves the Qo site of complex III.

Having acquired one electron from ubiquinol, the 'FeS protein' is freed from its electron donor and is able to migrate to the Cytochrome c1 subunit. 'FeS protein' then donates its electron to Cytochrome c1, reducing its bound heme group. The electron is from there transferred to an oxidized molecule of Cytochrome c externally bound to complex III, which then dissociates from the complex.  In addition, the reoxidation of the 'FeS protein' releases the proton bound to His181 into the intermembrane space.

The other electron, which was transferred to the bL heme, is used to reduce the bH heme, which in turn transfers the electron to the ubiquinone bound at the Qi site. The movement of this electron is energetically unfavourable, as the electron is moving towards the negatively charged side of the membrane. This is offset by a favourable change in EM from −100 mV in BL to +50mV in the BH heme.  The attached ubiquinone is thus reduced to a semiquinone radical. The proton taken up by Glu272 is subsequently transferred to a hydrogen-bonded water chain as Glu272 rotates 170° to hydrogen bond a water molecule, in turn hydrogen-bonded to a propionate of the bL heme.

Because the last step leaves an unstable semiquinone at the Qi site, the reaction is not yet fully completed.  A second Q cycle is necessary, with the second electron transfer from cytochrome bH reducing the semiquinone to ubiquinol. The ultimate products of the Q cycle are four protons entering the intermembrane space, two from the matrix and two from the reduction of two molecules of cytochrome c.  The reduced cytochrome c is eventually reoxidized by complex IV. The process is cyclic as the ubiquinol created at the Qi site can be reused by binding to the Qo site of complex III.

Notes

References 
 Trumpower, B.L. (2002) Biochim. Biophys. Acta 1555, 166-173
 Hunte, C., Palsdottir, H. and Trumpower, B.L. (2003) FEBS Letters 545, 39-46
 Trumpower, B.L. (1990) J. Biol. Chem., 11409-11412

Cellular respiration
Metabolism